PageStream (originally Publishing Partner) is a desktop publishing software package by Grasshopper LLC (United States), currently available for a variety of operating systems, including Windows, Linux, and macOS. The software was originally released under the name Publishing Partner for the Atari ST in 1986. It was also used on the Amiga platform starting in 1989. According to the official website, the latest version is PageStream 5.0.5.8, released October 11, 2010.

Autotracing application BME included.

References

External links

1986 software
Atari ST software
Desktop publishing software
Raster to vector conversion software
Classic Mac OS software
Amiga software
MorphOS software
Software that uses GTK
Proprietary commercial software for Linux